Lady Macbeth is a character from William Shakespeare's play Macbeth.

Lady Macbeth may also refer to:
 Lady Macbeth (historical) or Queen Gruoch of Scotland
 Lady Macbeth (album), a 2005 album by Lana Lane
 Lady Macbeth (sculpture), a sculpture by Elisabet Ney
 Lady MacBeth (spaceship), a fictional spaceship in Peter F. Hamilton's Night's Dawn trilogy
 Lady Macbeth, a 2008 novel by Susan King

See also
 Lady Macbeth of the Mtsensk District (novel), a novel by  Nikolai Leskov
 Lady Macbeth of the Mtsensk District (opera), an opera by Dmitri Shostakovich
 Lady Macbeth of the Mtsensk District (film), a 1989 film by Roman Balayan
 Siberian Lady Macbeth, a 1961 film by Andrzej Wajda
 Lady Macbeth (film), a 2016 British drama